Franklin Talley Lambert (born April 17, 1943) is a former American Football punter who played two seasons with the Pittsburgh Steelers of the National Football League. He had played college football at the University of Mississippi for the Ole Miss Rebels.

References

1943 births
Living people
American football punters
Ole Miss Rebels football players
Pittsburgh Steelers players
Players of American football from Mississippi
Sportspeople from Hattiesburg, Mississippi